The interleukin-18 receptor 1 (IL-18R1) is an interleukin receptor of the immunoglobulin superfamily. IL18R1 is its human gene. IL18R1 is also known as CDw218a (cluster of differentiation w218a).

The protein encoded by this gene is a cytokine receptor that belongs to the interleukin 1 receptor family. This receptor specifically binds interleukin 18 (IL18), and is essential for IL18 mediated signal transduction. IFN-alpha and IL12 are reported to induce the expression of this receptor in NK and T cells. This gene along with four other members of the interleukin 1 receptor family, including IL1R2, IL1R1, ILRL2 (IL-1Rrp2), and IL1RL1 (T1/ST2), form a gene cluster on chromosome 2q.

See also
 Interleukin-18 receptor

References

Further reading

External links
 

Clusters of differentiation
Immunoglobulin superfamily cytokine receptors